Zalog pri Šempetru ( or ) is a settlement in the Municipality of Žalec in east-central Slovenia. It lies in the hills above the left bank of the Ložnica River, a left tributary of the Savinja north of Šempeter v Savinjski Dolini. The area is part of the traditional region of Styria. The municipality is now included in the Savinja Statistical Region.

Name
The name of the settlement was changed from Zalog to Zalog pri Šempetru in 1953.

References

External links
Zalog pri Šempetru at Geopedia

Populated places in the Municipality of Žalec